Demavendia is a monotypic genus of flowering plants belonging to the family Apiaceae. The sole species is Demavendia pastinacifolia.

Its native range is Western and Central Asia.

References

Apioideae
Monotypic Apioideae genera